Johann Kowanda (1 December 1896 – 24 March 1947) was an Austrian footballer. He played in one match for the Austria national football team in 1922.

References

External links
 

1896 births
1947 deaths
Austrian footballers
Austria international footballers
Place of birth missing
Association footballers not categorized by position